Rice tea may refer to:

Hyeonmi cha, a Korean infusion made from boiled toasted short-grain brown rice
Genmaicha, a Japanese tea made from green tea leaves and toasted short-grain brown rice

See also
Tea Over Rice